Ipsissima verba, Latin for "the very words," is a legal term referring to material, usually established authority, that a writer or speaker is quoting or referring to.  For example, "the lawyer's position on segregation is supported by the ipsissima verba of the Supreme Court's holding in Brown v. Board of Education."

Other uses

In Christian theology, ipsissima verba is often used to denote the words attributed to Christ in the Gospels, and the words of characters in the Bible generally. Ipsissima verba is distinguished from ipsissima vox ('very voice') of Jesus Christ. 

Ipsissima verba is also the name of an album of the German band Samsas Traum.

Notes

Latin legal terminology